Tutong District Library (officially ) is a public library located in Tutong, Brunei. It is the only public library in Tutong District.

History 
The library was established on 1 September 1975, initially at Jalan Enche Awang. The construction of what is eventually the current building in Bukit Bendera began on 9 May 1990 and was completed in about two years. It was inaugurated on 21 July 1992 by Sultan Hassanal Bolkiah in conjunction with His Majesty's 46th birthday celebration in the district.

References 

Dewan Bahasa dan Pustaka Library
Libraries in Brunei
Libraries established in 1975
1975 establishments in Brunei